A list of films produced in Spain in 1982 (see 1982 in film).

1982

External links
 Spanish films of 1982 at the Internet Movie Database

1982
Spanish
Films